Litany is the fourth album by the Polish death metal band Vader. It was released in 2000 by Metal Blade Records. The album was nominated for a Fryderyk Award in the category 'Hard & Heavy Album of the Year (Album roku - hard & heavy)'.

Litany was recorded in 1999 at Red Studio in Gdańsk, Poland, and was produced by Piotr Wiwczarek and Adam Toczko. The album was mastered by Bartłomiej Kuźniak at Studio 333 in Częstochowa, Poland.

A music video was shot for the song "Cold Demons", which was directed by Adam Kuc. The album charted at number 1 on Gazeta Wyborcza bestsellers list in Poland.

Track listing

Personnel
Production and performance credits are adapted from the album liner notes.

Xeper / North

Xeper / North is the third single by the Polish death metal band Vader. It was released only in Poland in 2000 with special edition of Thrash'em All magazine entitled Super Poster" #2. Apart from promo single insert includes interview with band members, and additional information about the band.

Track listing

Release history

References

Vader (band) albums
2000 albums
Metal Blade Records albums
Metal Mind Productions albums